Decaprenylphospho-beta-D-erythro-pentofuranosid-2-ulose 2-reductase (decaprenylphospho-beta-D-ribofuranose 2'-epimerase, Rv3791, DprE2) is an enzyme with systematic name trans,octacis-decaprenylphospho-beta-D-arabinofuranose:NAD+ 2-oxidoreductase. This enzyme catalyses the following chemical reaction

 trans,octacis-decaprenylphospho-beta-D-arabinofuranose + NAD+  trans,octacis-decaprenylphospho-beta-D-erythro-pentofuranosid-2-ulose + NADH + H+

The reaction is catalysed in the reverse direction.

References

External links 
 

EC 1.1.1